The 2019 protests in Iran was a series of peaceful rallies and nationwide strikes organised by activists and employees, and unemployed people across Iran in early-2019, as part of the 2018-2019 Iranian general strikes and protests.

Background
Hardships and protests are frequent in Iran, especially with sanctions, deals, agreements, tensions, interferences into other conflicts (the Syrian Civil War and Iraq), tensions among the economy, civilian issues and governmental problems. The 2017-2018 Iranian protests was a starter of protest movements and unrest that frequently hit the nation, colliding with the 2018-2019 Iranian general strikes and protests.

Protests
January:
Farmers gathered in Isfahan on 2 January to protest the lack of water in the Zayanderud. The protestors were met by security forces who fired tear gas and live rounds into the air to disperse the crowds. On 22 January, retirees gathered in front of the parliament building in Tehran and chanted "Torture and forced confessions, have no effect anymore". Two days later, on 24 January, teachers gathered in five provinces to protest their current living and teaching conditions.

February:
On 14 February, teachers in Ardabil, Mashhad, Marivan, Sanandaj, Orumieh, and Kermanshah gathered outside of the offices of the Ministry of Education and protested the arrest of teachers, and unfavourable living and teaching conditions. On the same day a teacher's rights activist was arrested in Sanandaj.

On 26 February, railway workers in Tabriz and Shahroud went on strike. Earlier that day, a large group of retirees gathered in front of the parliament building in Tehran to protest low pensions. Protesters chanted "no nation has seen 
such a dishonourable parliament" and "shame on those who claim to be the upholders of justice".

March:
On 3 March, teachers across Iran started a three-day nationwide sit in, in protest to low living wages and unfavourable job conditions. This is the third sit in this year by teachers across Iran. The same day, railway workers in Andimeshk went on strike to protest unpaid wages and blocked the Ahvaz to Mashhad train from running its route. The families of Esmail Bakhshi and Sepideh Gholian also gathered in front of the judiciary in Shush to protest their arrest.

The following day on 4 March, mobile bazars in Tehran, Tabriz, Ahvaz, Mashhad, and Isfahan went on strike to protest the new initiative started by the Ministry of Communications which prevents them from registering the smartphones they want to sell.

On 5 March, workers of Chamshir Dam in Gachsaran went on strike and gathered outside the governorate to protest 14 months of unpaid wages. On the same day, workers of the Ministry of Agriculture gathered in front of the parliament building in Tehran and protested their low wages. Railway strikes also continued in Tabriz and Lorestan province.

Strikers was seen protesting in Mashhad, Khorramshahr and Tehran and multiple arrests was made amid protests and widespread anger over deteriorating conditions and problems. 

May:
On 1 May (May day), workers, students, and teachers gathered in front of the parliament building in Tehran to protest poor economic conditions, and lack of individual rights. Protesters chanted "Workers, teachers, students, unite" and "High costs and inflation are hurting people's lives". The security forces clamped down on the protests and 40 demonstrators were arrested.

On 2 May, teachers across 13 provinces in Iran protested their poor work and living conditions. The security forces arrested at least 3 teachers in Tehran.

On 3-5 May, teachers staged demonstrations and rallies all across Iran, notably Mashhad, where teacher’s unions led mass protests demanding the release of political prisoners and teachers arrested during previous strike movement and denounced the suppression of teachers strikes. Protesters were arrested.

June-July:
On 23 June, protestors in Kermanshah can be seen wearing yellow vests in inspiration by the French Yellow vests movement. Workers and employees was seen also holding placards and staging rallies over the next few days in Tehran and Alborz province against unpaid wages. In late-July, worker demonstrations was staged against unpaid wages.

See also
 2018-2019 Iranian general strikes and protests
 2018 Iranian protest movement

References

2019 protests
General strikes in Asia
2019 in Iran
Protests in Iran